Sogam Lolab is a municipality situated in the Lolab Valley of the Indian union territory of Jammu and Kashmir and is the home of many administrative offices for the area and acts as Sub-District, This place is jurisdiction of Lolab Valley. It is separated by Nagmarg Meadows from Bandipora district to east.

References 

Kashmir
Cities and towns in Kupwara district